Hoplodrina octogenaria, the uncertain, is a moth of the family Noctuidae. It is found in the Palearctic realm (Europe, Russia, Turkey, Transcaucasia, Siberia, Uzbekistan, Kyrgyzstan, Altai, north Mongolia, North Korea, and north China).

Description

The wingspan is 28–34 mm. The ground colour is rich brown or tawny brown; darker in the female. The reniform and orbicular spots are darker than the ground colour and outlined in white. The darker-than-the-ground-colour median line is usually wide. The name uncertain refers to its being similar to and confused with Hoplodrina blanda and Hoplodrina ambigua. Certain identification requires dissection of the genitalia.See Townsend et al.

Biology
The length of the forewings is 14–16 mm. The moth flies in one generation from late May to August. .

The larvae feed on Lamium, Primula, Stellaria and Rumex species.

Notes
The flight season refers to Belgium and the Netherlands. This may vary in other parts of the range.

References

External links

The Uncertain at UKmoths
Funet Taxonomy
Fauna Europaea
Lepiforum.de Includes photographs of genitalia.
Vlindernet.nl 

Caradrinini
Moths of Europe
Moths of Asia
Moths described in 1781
Taxa named by Johann August Ephraim Goeze